My Little Pony: Friendship Is Magic is a 2010 animated television series developed by Lauren Faust. The show follows a studious anthropomorphic unicorn (later an alicorn) pony named Twilight Sparkle (Tara Strong) as her mentor, Princess Celestia (Nicole Oliver), guides her to learn about friendship in the town of Ponyville. Twilight and her dragon assistant Spike (Cathy Weseluck) become close friends with five other ponies: Applejack (Ashleigh Ball), Rarity (Tabitha St. Germain), Fluttershy (Andrea Libman), Rainbow Dash (Ball), and Pinkie Pie (Libman). Each of the ponies represent a different facet of friendship, and Twilight discovers herself to be a key part of the magical artifacts known as the "Elements of Harmony". The ponies travel on adventures and help others around Equestria while working out problems that arise in their own friendships. First aired on The Hub (later renamed Discovery Family), each season comprises 26 episodes, with the exception of season 3, which contained 13 episodes. Though initially intended to be 11 minutes, each episode is 22 minutes long.  Other media released during and after its run included a feature-length film  and 6 clip shows.

My Little Pony: Friendship Is Magic is produced by Hasbro Studios in the United States and DHX Media/Vancouver in Canada. Internationally, My Little Pony: Friendship Is Magic aired on Treehouse TV in Canada, Boomerang in the United Kingdom until 2012 and on Tiny Pop and Pop, two British free-to-air children's television channels owned and operated by Sony Pictures Television, from September 2013, Okto in Singapore, Cartoon Network and later Boomerang with Eleven airing repeats in Australia and TV2 in New Zealand, ntv7 and Astro Ceria in Malaysia, e-Junior in the United Arab Emirates, Tooniverse in South Korea, and TV Tokyo (seasons 1–2) in Japan. The series garnered positive reviews from critics and received a Hugo Award nomination for Best Dramatic Presentation, Short Form for the episode "The Cutie Map".

Series overview

Episodes

Season 1 (2010–11)

Season 2 (2011–12)

Season 3 (2012–13)

Season 4 (2013–14)

Season 5 (2015)

Season 6 (2016)

Season 7 (2017)

My Little Pony: The Movie (2017)

Season 8 (2018)

Holiday Special (2018)

My Little Pony Best Gift Ever is a double-length Christmas-themed special that aired in between the eighth and ninth seasons of the series.

Season 9 (2019)

On February 17, 2018, at the American International Toy Fair, a ninth season was announced by Hasbro. In a TV Kids Guide by Gaumont, it was confirmed that season nine will have 26 episodes. At the following year's Toy Fair in New York, it was confirmed that this will be the final season of the series. It premiered on April 6, 2019. Among highlights include the series' 200th episode as well as the return of "Weird Al" Yankovic and Patton Oswalt as Cheese Sandwich and Quibble Pants, respectively.

Rainbow Roadtrip (2019)

My Little Pony: Rainbow Roadtrip is a 60-minute special that aired on Discovery Family during the season nine mid-season hiatus between episodes 13 and 14. It was produced by the Irish animation studio Boulder Media rather than DHX and features the same animation style used in the 2017 movie.

Animated shorts (2019) 
A series of five animated shorts were published weekly to the My Little Pony YouTube channel in early 2019 in the months prior to the season nine premiere.

Clip Shows (2020)

Clip show episodes of the series are being released exclusively through the 9Now video-on-demand service in Australia. These episodes replace the words "Friendship is Magic" in the series logo with "Friendship is Forever" in the opening sequence, and they feature various clips of episodes from seasons one through nine alongside brand new animation. These episodes were written by Josh Haber and directed by Denny Lu and Mike Myhre.

Notes

References

Lists of American children's animated television series episodes
Lists of Canadian children's animated television series episodes